Cash Township is a township in Perkins County, South Dakota, US.

Cash Township has the name of Cassius "Cash" Timmons, a cattleman.

References

Townships in Perkins County, South Dakota